Romainville Island is an artificial island in Seychelles, lying 2 km from the capital Victoria.

History
The island was created artificially during the 2000s. It belongs to the Mahe Port Islands, which are mostly artificial islands created by funds from Dubai when the Dubai dredger was placed in Seychelles.
The works began in 1998.
In 2012 the island was ready for installment of wind turbines.
In 2013 the island was visited by UN inspectors inspecting worldwide scale of wind farms.
In the end of 2013 the wind farm was launched
in 2014, it was reported that the PUC farm on Romainville was a success
in 2018, Masdar will open a solar farm on the island

Geography
The artificial island plan is an industrialized plan

Demographics
The warden's house is located on the island's south point.

Administration
The island belongs to English River District.

Image gallery

References

External links 

 info
 Mahe Map 2015

Artificial islands of Seychelles
Islands of Mahé Islands